John Hathorn (January 9, 1749 – February 19, 1825) was an American politician and Continental Army officer from New York.

Life
He completed preparatory studies and became a surveyor and a school teacher. He moved to Warwick in the Province of New York, then a part of the precinct of Goshen and married Elizabeth Welling. He owned slaves. He was a captain in the local colonial militia, and became a colonel of the Fourth Orange County Regiment February 7, 1776, and served throughout the Revolutionary War.  He served on the committee appointed to determine an effective location for the Hudson River Chain which prevented the British from advancing upriver, and himself wrote the report. He was one of the commanders of the Battle of Minisink. After the war, on September 26, 1786, Hathorn became a brigadier general of the Orange County militia, and on October 8, 1793, a major general of the state militia.

Hathorn was a member from Orange County of the New York State Assembly in 1778, 1780, from 1782 to 1785, in 1795 and 1805, and served as Speaker in 1784.

He was a member of the New York State Senate from 1786 to 1790 and from 1799 to 1803, and was a member of the Council of Appointment in 1787 and 1789. He was elected to the Confederation Congress in December 1788 but did not attend because it soon become defunct. In March 1789, he was elected to the First United States Congress, and served from April 23, 1789, to March 3, 1791. He was elected as a Democratic-Republican to the Fourth United States Congress, and served from March 4, 1795 to March 3, 1797.

Hathorn engaged in mercantile pursuits until the time of his death.

He was buried in Warwick Cemetery. His stone house still stands on Hathorn Road, with his and his wife's initials worked in red brick on the south gable of the house.

References
 John Hathorn's Revolutionary Legacy Information Page
 

1749 births
1825 deaths
People from Wilmington, Delaware
People of colonial Delaware
American Quakers
Anti-Administration Party members of the United States House of Representatives from New York (state)
Democratic-Republican Party members of the United States House of Representatives from New York (state)
Speakers of the New York State Assembly
New York (state) state senators
American slave owners
People from Warwick, New York
American militia generals
New York (state) militiamen in the American Revolution